Eiji Takeuchi (born 13 May 1959) is a Japanese former professional tennis player.

Takeuchi was a member of Japan's Davis Cup side during the 1980s. He appeared in a total of seven ties, including a 1985 Davis Cup World Group relegation play-off against Spain.

His best performance on the Grand Prix circuit came in the 1981 Japan Open, where he reached the second round.

Takeuchi featured in the singles qualifying draw for the 1986 Wimbledon Championships and the doubles main draw at the 1989 Australian Open, as an alternate pairing with Hitoshi Shirato.

Following his playing career he became a tennis coach and has captained Japan in the Davis Cup. Most notably he led Japan to a World Group playoff win over India in 2011, which secured the team a place in the World Group for the first time since 1985.

See also
List of Japan Davis Cup team representatives

References

External links
 
 
 

1959 births
Living people
Japanese male tennis players
20th-century Japanese people